The 1998 World Weightlifting Championships were held in Lahti, Finland November 7–15, 1998. The men's competition in the featherweight (– 62 kg) division was staged on November 9, 1998.

Medalists

Records

Results

New records

References
Results
Weightlifting World Championships Seniors Statistics, Pages 14–15 

1998 World Weightlifting Championships